Erik Kule Palmstierna (10 November 1877 – 22 November 1959) was a Swedish Social Democratic politician and diplomat. He served as Minister for Foreign Affairs from March 1920 to October 1920. Between October 1917 to March 1920 he served as Minister for Naval Affairs (the Swedish Minister of the Navy and Coastal Artillery).

His wife was the women's rights activist Ebba Palmstierna.

References 

1877 births
1959 deaths
Swedish Social Democratic Party politicians
Swedish Ministers for Foreign Affairs
Government ministers of Sweden
Ambassadors of Sweden to the United Kingdom
Swedish Navy officers
Georgist politicians